World's Finest may refer to:

Comics 
 World's Finest Comics, an American comic book series 1941–1986
 World's Finest Team, a superhero team
 Worlds' Finest, a reimagining of the classic title, launched in 2012
 World's Finest (film), a short film
 "World's Finest" (Superman: The Animated Series), an episode of the TV series 
 "Worlds Finest", an episode of the TV series Supergirl

Other uses 
 World's Finest Chocolate, an American chocolate company

See also